Brontaea is a genus of house flies, insects in the family Muscidae. There are about five described species in Brontaea.

Species
These five species belong to the genus Brontaea:
 Brontaea cilifera (Malloch, 1920) i
 Brontaea debilis (Williston, 1896) i
 Brontaea delecta b
 Brontaea humilis (Zetterstedt, 1860) i b
 Brontaea quadristigma (Thomson, 1869) i
Data sources: i = ITIS, c = Catalogue of Life, g = GBIF, b = Bugguide.net

References

Further reading

 

Articles created by Qbugbot
Muscidae genera